Rurimicrobium is a Gram-negative, aerobic, non-spore-forming and non-motile genus of bacteria from the family of Chitinophagaceae with one known species (Rurimicrobium arvi). Rurimicrobium arvi has beenisolated from farmland soil.

References

Chitinophagia
Bacteria genera
Monotypic bacteria genera
Taxa described in 2017